SUMO is a book series by publishing house TASCHEN, so named due to their size.

History 
The first SUMO was written by German-Australian photographer Helmut Newton. The book is a monograph that showcases his work in fashion and celebrity photography. Featured portraits include Catherine Deneuve, Nicolas Cage and Mickey Rourke. The book is credited with changing the fortunes of Taschen.

It was initially released as a limited edition of 10,000 copies in 1999, selling for $1,500. The first run was numbered and signed by Newton. Owing to the size and weight of the book, a bespoke stand was designed by Phillipe Starck to support it. The first copy of the book was signed by 80 of the celebrities featured in it. This was subsequently sold at auction in Berlin on 6 August 2000 for $430,000, becoming the biggest and most expensive book produced in the 20th century.
 
A subsequent edition, edited by Newton's widow June, was released in September 2009. Although oversized, it was much smaller, measuring about 12 by 17 inches. This edition came with a perspex stand to display it and retailed for $150.

Other SUMO titles
Other books belonging to the SUMO series include:
 The Rolling Stones
 Annie Leibovitz
 GOAT: GREATEST OF ALL TIME: A TRIBUTE TO MUHAMMAD ALI
 Sebastião Salgado. GENESIS
 David Hockney: A Bigger Book
The David Bailey SUMO

References

External links
Taschen website

Books of photographs